Martin Archer Flavin (November 2, 1883 – December 27, 1967) was an American playwright and novelist. His novel Journey in the Dark received both the Harper Prize for 1943 and a Pulitzer Prize for 1944. He was one of the few writers to receive a Pulitzer for a play and a novel. His play, The Criminal Code was produced on Broadway in 1929 and was the basis for the motion picture The Criminal Code. He had two other hits, Broken Dishes, and Cross Roads, on Broadway.

Early life

Flavin was born on November 2, 1883, in San Francisco, California. He grew up in Chicago and was a Sigma Chi at the University of Chicago, which he attended from 1903 to 1905. 

He was an army cavalryman during World War I and enjoyed riding for most of his life. Flavin was married three times, to Daphne Virginia Springer in 1914, Sarah Keese Arnold in 1919, and Cornelia Clampett in 1949. He had three children.

Career

Flavin left college to work as a reporter on a Chicago newspaper. He then took over the family's business called the American Wallpaper Company. He wrote plays while working there. 

He came to Carmel-by-the-Sea, California in the 1920s. He and playwrights Perry Newberry, and Ira Remsen produced original dramas at the Carmel Arts and Crafts Club theater at that time. 

Flavin then won a Harper Prize for his play, The Criminal Code. By 1929, he had three plays running on Broadway. He wrote the novels Journey in the Dark, that received both the Harper Prize in 1943 and a Pulitzer Prize in 1944. He was the oldest writer to win the $10,000 Harper prize. Other novels included: Mr. Littlejohn (1940), Corporal Cat (1941), 'The Enchanted (1947), Cameron Hill (1957), Black and White (1950), and Red Poppies and White Marble (1962).

Flavin moved to Carmel Highlands during the Great Depression to build a home on Yankee Point south of Point Lobos. He also owned a  ranch in the Cachagua area in upper Carmel Valley. 

Death

Flavin died at the Carmel Community Hospital on December 27, 1967, in Carmel-by-the-Sea at the age of 84.

Novels

 Mr. Littlejohn (1940)
 Corporal Cat (1941)
 Journey in the Dark (1943)
 The Enchanted (1947)
 Cameron Hill (1957)

Non-fiction

 '[https://archive.org/details/blackandwhitefro010809mbp/page/n4/mode/1up 'Black and White: From the Cape to the Congo (1950)]
 Red Poppies and White Marble (1962)

Plays

 Children of the Moon (1923, produced on Broadway 1923)
 Emergency Case (1923)
 Caleb Stone's Death Watch (1923, produced on Broadway 1924)
 Achilles Had a Heel (1924, produced on Broadway 1935)
 Lady of the Rose (1925, produced on Broadway 1925)
 Service for Two (1926, produced on Broadway 1926)
 Brains (1926, produced on Broadway 1926)
 The Criminal Code (1929, produced on Broadway 1929), the basis for several motion pictures: the Columbia Pictures film of the same name (1931), the Spanish-language version El Código penal shot simultaneously on the same sets, the 1933 French film Criminel and two Columbia Pictures remakes: Penitentiary (1938) and Convicted (1950).
 Broken Dishes (1929, produced on Broadway 1930), the basis for the 1931 motion picture Too Young to Marry, the 1936 motion picture Love Begins at 20 (a.k.a. All One Night), and the 1940 motion picture Calling All Husbands; adapted for television in 1951 episode of Pulitzer Prize Playhouse
 Crossroads (1929, produced on Broadway 1929), the basis for the 1932 motion picture The Age of Consent
 Tapestry in Gray (1935, produced on Broadway 1935)
 Around the Corner (1936, produced on Broadway 1936)

Screenplays

 The Big House (1930) (additional dialogue) 
 Passion Flower (1930) (adaptation of novel by Kathleen Norris)
 Laughing Sinners (1931) (dialogue) (uncredited) ... a.k.a. Complete Surrender (USA)
 Three Who Loved (1931)

References

External links

 Photos of the first edition of Journey in the Dark
 
 
 
 
 
 
 
 
 

1883 births
1967 deaths
20th-century American novelists
American male screenwriters
Writers from San Francisco
Pulitzer Prize for the Novel winners
American male novelists
20th-century American dramatists and playwrights
University of Chicago alumni
American male dramatists and playwrights
20th-century American male writers
Screenwriters from California
People from Carmel-by-the-Sea, California
20th-century American screenwriters